Balloch is an unincorporated community in the southwest corner of the town of Cornish, New Hampshire, in the United States. The name is derived from the Balloch Farm, originally owned by James Balloch (1761-1840) and, later, by his son William Balloch (1820-1893).  It was the site of a small Boston & Maine Railroad station, built in the 1890s and destroyed in a freight train derailment on February 12, 1928.

History 

The Balloch Farm was settled by James Balloch soon after his arrival in the US in 1790. He married Sarah Chase, of the long-standing Cornish Chase family in 1796. Under his son, William, the farm prospered, producing milk for area creameries. The Sullivan County Railroad was constructed through the farm in 1849, with William Balloch serving as a contractor to the railroad. Starting in the 1890s, the Balloch station was built to ship this milk directly to processors, such as the Bellows Falls Cooperative Creamery.

Balloch today
Balloch at one time was marked by the "Balloch's Crossing Farm & Forge" sign at the historic Balloch Farm (formerly the home of North Star Canoe Rentals). The railroad, now operated by the New England Central Railroad, continues to feature daily trains through Balloch, including its own freight trains, as well as freight trains of Pan Am Railways and the daily Vermonter passenger train of Amtrak.

See also
New Hampshire
List of cities and towns in New Hampshire
Cornish, New Hampshire

References

Unincorporated communities in New Hampshire
New Hampshire populated places on the Connecticut River
Unincorporated communities in Sullivan County, New Hampshire
Cornish, New Hampshire